Saint-Louis Agglomération is the communauté d'agglomération, an intercommunal structure, centred on the town of Saint-Louis. It is located in the Haut-Rhin department, in the Grand Est region, northeastern France. Created in 2017, its seat is in Saint-Louis. Its area is 268.0 km2. Its population was 81,696 in 2019, of which 22,413 in Saint-Louis proper.

Composition
The communauté d'agglomération consists of the following 40 communes:

Attenschwiller
Bartenheim
Blotzheim
Brinckheim
Buschwiller
Folgensbourg
Geispitzen
Hagenthal-le-Bas
Hagenthal-le-Haut
Hégenheim
Helfrantzkirch
Hésingue
Huningue
Kappelen
Kembs
Knœringue
Kœtzingue
Landser
Leymen
Liebenswiller
Magstatt-le-Bas
Magstatt-le-Haut
Michelbach-le-Bas
Michelbach-le-Haut
Neuwiller
Ranspach-le-Bas
Ranspach-le-Haut
Rantzwiller
Rosenau
Saint-Louis
Schlierbach
Sierentz
Steinbrunn-le-Haut
Stetten
Uffheim
Village-Neuf
Wahlbach
Waltenheim
Wentzwiller
Zaessingue

References

Saint-Louis
Saint-Louis